Primula filipes is a species of flowering plant within the genus Primula and family Primulaceae.

Description 
Primula filipes is an annual species. Plants possess a basal rosette of leaves, which range in length from 2 – 5cm long. Leaves are green, long, toothed and spoon shaped. Leaf blades can be orbicular to ovate or cordate. Stems can range from 10 – 30cm tall and can host up to eight flowers. Flowers are bell shaped and pale pink in colour.

Distribution 
Primula filipes is native to the continent of Asia, where it can be found in: South-Central China (South-West Sichuan, North-East and Central Yunnan), the Eastern Himalayas, Myanmar, Nepal and Assam.

Habitat 
Primula filipes is an adaptable species that can grow in a variety of habitats. P. filipes can be found in temperate deciduous woodlands where it grows in shade. It will also grow in marshes near to canals and rice fields. It is also been found growing in alpine habitat such as in rocky cliffs and mountain slopes. The species is also sometimes cultivated inside of temple and village gardens within its natural range. Plants can be found at elevations ranging from 2000–2700 metres above sea level.

References 

filipes
Plants described in 1882